Albomycins are a group of naturally occurring antibiotics belonging to the class of sideromycins, which are "compounds composed of iron carriers called siderophores linked to antibiotic moieties".  They are particularly effective against Gram-negative bacteria of the family Enterobacteriaceae and few Gram-positive bacteria such s Streptococcus pneumoniae, Bacillus subtilis and Staphylococcus aureus. In 2000 a group of scientists from SmithKline Beecham Pharmaceuticals, UK reported that the antibiotic part of albomycin in vitro can inhibit seryl t-RNA synthetase from both eukaryotic and prokaryotic representatives.

Structure
Albomycins are naturally occurring sideromycins produced by some streptomycetes. The siderophore part of albomycin δ2 is similar to ferrichrome. It contains three molecules of δ-N-hydroxy-δ-N-acetyl ornithine linked to a serine, all by peptide linkage. The C-terminus of the serine is linked to another serine attached to the antibiotically active 4’-thio (N4-carbamoyl-3-methyl) cytidine moiety. The trihydroxamate part serves the siderophore function as it can trap Fe+3 and is essential for active transport of the antibiotic. Iron-free albomycin δ2 has a molecular weight of 992 Da, and when loaded with iron it is 1045 Da.

References

Antibiotics
Siderophores